Alcippe (Ancient Greek: Ἀλκίππη, Alkippe) is a character of Greek mythology, daughter of the God of war, Ares and the mortal princess, Aglauros.

Myth  
According to myth, she was attacked and/or raped on the beach of Athens by Halirrhothius, a son of the God of sea, Poseidon.  

Her father, Ares, came to her aid, and killed Halirrhothius. Poseidon demanded justice for his son, and Ares was judged by the Court of the Gods in what, according to the myth, was the first trial in history. The trial had place on Areopagus, an hill adjacent to the Acropolis of Athens.  

Ares claimed to have killed Halirrhothius to defend/avenge his daughter from rape, and Alcippe confirmed her father's statement. The gods believed them and, as there were no witnesses to the contrary, completely acquitted Ares.

References  
 

Children of Ares 
Demigods in classical mythology 
Attican characters in Greek mythology 
Deeds of Ares 
Princesses in Greek mythology